is a Japanese manga series written and illustrated by Chica Umino. It was serialized in Takarajimasha's shōjo manga magazine Cutie Comic from 2000 to 2001, before being transferred to Shueisha's josei manga magazines Young You (2001–2005) and Chorus (2005–2006); its chapters were collected in 10 tankōbon volumes. The series depicts the lives and relationships of a group of art school students who live in the same apartment building.

An anime television series adaptation by J.C.Staff was broadcast for two seasons on Fuji TV. The first 24-episode season aired from April to September 2005; the second 12-episode season aired from June to September 2006. It is also the first show to premiere on the Noitamina programming block. The series was also adapted into a live-action film premiered in July 2006, and two separate live-action television dramas in 2008, one broadcast in Japan on Fuji TV from January to March 2008, and the other broadcast in Taiwan on CTS from May to August of the same year.

The Honey and Clover manga has had over 8.5 million copies in circulation. In 2004, the manga won the 27th Kodansha Manga Award in the shōjo category. It also topped the Kono Manga ga Sugoi! list for female readers in 2006 and 2007.

Plot

Yūta Takemoto, Takumi Mayama and Shinobu Morita are three young men who live in the same apartment complex and are students at an art college in Tokyo. One day, they are introduced to Hagumi "Hagu" Hanamoto, the daughter of a cousin of Shūji Hanamoto, an art professor, who has come to live with Hanamoto and has become a first year art student at the art school that everyone attends. Yuta and Shinobu both fall in love with Hagu, but Yuta hides his feelings and tries to be a friend to Hagu while Shinobu expresses his love in ways that seem only to scare Hagu, such as calling her "Mousey" and constantly photographing her. Hagu herself, though initially timid and afraid of company, gradually warms up to the three.

The group comes to include Ayumi Yamada, a master of pottery who is well known by her nickname "Tetsujin" (Iron Lady), who becomes very close to Hagu. When not at school, she helps run the family liquor store. While Ayumi is popular with many young men, she falls in love with Takumi, who does not reciprocate her feelings and considers her a very dear friend. Instead, Takumi pursues an older woman, Rika Harada, a widowed friend of Professor Hanamoto who runs an architecture studio she founded with her late husband. The story follows these five characters in their love triangles, unrequited love, graduating from college, finding jobs, and learning more about themselves.

Media

Manga
Written and illustrated by Chika Umino, Honey and Clover was first serialized in Takarajimasha's shōjo manga magazine  from 2000 to 2001; Takarajimasha released a collected volume on January 29, 2001. The series was transferred to Shueisha's josei manga magazine Young You, where it ran from October 6, 2001, to October 8, 2005, when the magazine ceased its publication. It was then transferred to Shueisha's Chorus magazine, where it ran from December 28, 2005, to July 28, 2006. The 64 chapters were collected in ten tankōbon, released from August 19, 2002, to September 8, 2006. A box set collecting the ten volumes was released on May 10, 2007. Two spin-off chapters were published in Chorus on November 28, 2006, and October 28, 2008.

The manga is licensed in North America by Viz Media, which began serializing it in Shojo Beat magazine in August 2007. Viz Media released the ten volumes from March 4, 2008, to June 1, 2010.

Volume list

Anime

An anime television series adaptation, animated by J.C.Staff, was broadcast for two seasons on Fuji TV's then-new Noitamina block. The first season was directed by Ken'ichi Kasai, and consisted of 24 episodes that aired from April 15 to September 30, 2005, plus two DVD-only episodes, released on December 14, 2005, and February 24, 2006. The season features insert songs performed by Shikao Suga and Spitz.

The second season, Honey and Clover II, consisted of 12 episodes, which aired from June 30 to September 15, 2006. Like the first season, the second season also features insert songs performed by Shikao Suga and Spitz.

Both seasons were rebroadcast in Japan by the anime CS television network Animax, which also later broadcast the series across its respective networks in Hong Kong, Taiwan, South Korea, and other regions. The series was first broadcast in English on Animax's Southeast Asia network starting August 1, 2006.

Funimation got the broadcast rights to Viz Media's dub and it premiered on the Funimation Channel on September 19, 2009. Viz Media have subsequently released the entire series across three DVD collection sets. In Australia, the anime is distributed on DVD by Madman Entertainment. In May 2019, Discotek Media announced the license of the series.

Live-action film
The series was adapted as a live-action feature film produced by Asmik Ace Entertainment. It was directed by Masahiro Takada from a screenplay by Masahiko Kawahara and Masahiro Takada, and starred Arashi's Sakurai Sho as Takemoto, Yū Aoi as Hagu, Yūsuke Iseya as Morita, Ryō Kase as Mayama, and Megumi Seki as Ayumi. It was released in Japanese theaters on July 22, 2006. The film was released theatrically in the United States in fall of 2007 by Viz Media. The DVD for the film was released on January 12, 2007.

Songs

Opening Theme: "魔法のコトバ (Mahou no Kotoba)" by Spitz.

Ending Theme: "アオゾラペダル (Aozora Pedal)" by Arashi.

Live-action drama

Japanese TV drama
A Japanese television drama adaptation of the series premiered on January 8, 2008. It aired every Tuesday at 21:00 JST for 11 episodes on Fuji TV until March 18, 2008. Written by Kaneko Shigeki, and directed by Masaki Tanamura and Hiroaki Matsuyama, the show starred Toma Ikuta as Takemoto, Riko Narumi as Hagumi, Hiroki Narimiya as Morita, Osamu Mukai as Mayama, and Natsuki Harada as Ayumi. The music for the series was provided by Shōgo Kaida, Keiichi Miyako (SOPHIA) and Shin Kōno, while the theme song to the series was "Canvas" by the Japanese R&B singer Ken Hirai. A DVD set was released for the series on July 11, 2008.

Taiwanese TV drama
The manga was adapted into a Taiwanese drama titled starring Lego Lee as An Zhu Ben (Takemoto), Chiaki Ito as Hua Ben Yu (Hagumi), Eddie Peng as Ren Sen Tian (Morita), Joe Cheng as Den Zhen Shan (Mayama), and Janine Chang as He Ya Gong (Ayumi). It was produced by Huang Zhi Ming and directed by Li Yun Chan.

It was broadcast on free-to-air on Chinese Television System (CTS) (華視) from May 25, 2008 to August 31, 2008 on Sundays at 22:00.

Reception
The manga has had over 8.5 million copies in circulation. In 2004, Honey and Clover won the 27th Kodansha Manga Award for the shōjo category. The manga topped the 2006 and 2007 list of Takarajimasha's Kono Manga ga Sugoi! guidebook of top 20 manga series for female readers.

About.com'''s Deb Aoki lists Honey and Clover as the best new manga of 2008. Yū Aoi won the award for Best Actress at the 28th Yokohama Film Festival for her role as Hagumi Hanamoto in the live-action film.

Notes

References

Further reading
 

External links

 Honey and Clover'' - Animax Asia
 Honey and Clover Official Shueisha Manga site 
 Honey and Clover Official Anime site 
 Honey and Clover Official Live-Action Movie site 
 Honey and Clover Official Japanese TV Drama site 
 Feng Mi Xing Yun Cao Official Taiwanese TV Drama site 
 Chika Umino official site 
 
 

2000s Japanese-language films
2008 Taiwanese television series debuts
Art in anime and manga
Coming-of-age anime and manga
Discotek Media
J.C.Staff
Japanese television dramas based on manga
Josei manga
Live-action films based on manga
Manga adapted into films
New People films
Noitamina
Romance anime and manga
Shōjo manga
Shueisha manga
Slice of life anime and manga
Taiwanese television dramas based on manga
Television shows written by Yōsuke Kuroda
Viz Media anime
Viz Media manga
Winner of Kodansha Manga Award (Shōjo)